Maekawa is a Japanese surname. Notable people with the surname include:

, Japanese tennis player
, Japanese footballer
, Japanese footballer
, Japanese sport wrestler
, Japanese industrialist and philanthropist
, Japanese politician
, Japanese architect
, Japanese fencer
, Japanese woodblock printer
, Japanese rice farmer and namesake of Mykawa, Texas
, Japanese writer

Fictional characters
, protagonist of the manga series Doubt!!
, a character in the visual novel Ayakashi
, a character in the video game The Idolmaster Cinderella Girls
, a character in the manga series Ultimate Muscle

See also
Maekawa's algorithm

Japanese-language surnames